"Geronimo's Cadillac" is a song co-written and recorded by American country folk artist Michael Martin Murphey, then billed as Michael Murphey, and was the title cut of his 1972 debut album Geronimo's Cadillac which was an A&M Records release.

Background and impact
Murphey was inspired to write "Geronimo's Cadillac" by a photograph showing Geronimo at the wheel of a luxury touring car with a backseat,: this photograph was reproduced as a drawing on the back album cover of Geronimo's Cadillac and also on the picture sleeve of the single. The July–August 1987 issue of  American Songwriter quotes Murphey as saying: "the two images together Geronimo and a Cadillac just struck me as a song title. It was every irony I could ever think of about our culture in two words. Their attempt to make of him what we would define as a civilized person. That was the reason they put him in a Cadillac in the first place. He was actually in jail at the time." The photograph was taken at a show for the US press held June 11, 1905 at a ranch located southwest of Ponca City, Oklahoma: Geronimo, then imprisoned at Fort Sill, is actually posed in a Locomobile rather than a Cadillac.

Released July 31, 1972 as a single which edited the track's original 4:39 length to 3:21 "Geronimo's Cadillac" reached number 37 on the Hot 100 in Billboard magazine. The track also charted in Canada with a peak of number 30 on the Top Singles chart in RPM magazine. "Geronimo's Cadillac" afforded Murphey his sole Hot 100 charting until "Wildfire" on Epic Records reached number 3 in 1975. The success of "Wildfire" caused A&M to re-issue "Geronimo's Cadillac" with a new B-side: "Blessing in Disguise" a track from Murphey's 1973 album Cosmic Cowboy Souvenir, replacing "Boy From the Country." However this re-issue of "Geronimo's Cadillac" did not chart, failing to deflect interest from Epic's follow-up single release to "Wildfire": "Carolina in the Pines", which fell just short of the top 20.

Chart performance

Original release

Cover versions
A cover version by Jeff Stevens and the Bullets peaked at number 53 on the Billboard Hot Country Singles chart in 1987. "Geronimo's Cadillac" has also been recorded by Hoyt Axton, Cher, Claire Hamill, Jacques Kloes, Lost Gonzo Band, Manfred Mann's Earth Band, Dick Gaughan, Mary McCaslin, Chris Leslie and Johnny Rivers. Native American singer Bill Miller performs "Geronimo's Cadillac" on his 1992 live album Reservation Road. Chris Leslie's solo album "Origins"contains his cover.

References

Michael Martin Murphey songs
1972 debut singles
Cadillac (song)
Songs written by Michael Martin Murphey
A&M Records singles
Song recordings produced by Bob Johnston
1972 songs
1987 singles
Jeff Stevens and the Bullets songs
Songs about Native Americans
Songs about cars